Microtube may refer to:

 Microtube (electronics)
 Microtube (microtechnology)